Henry Berthold Mann (27 October 1905, Vienna – 1 February 2000, Tucson) was a professor of mathematics and statistics at the Ohio State University. Mann proved the Schnirelmann-Landau conjecture in number theory, and as a result earned the 1946 Cole Prize. He and his student developed the ("Mann-Whitney") U-statistic of nonparametric statistics. Mann published the first mathematical book on the design of experiments: .

Early life of a number theorist
Born in Vienna, Austria-Hungary, to a Jewish family, Mann earned his Ph.D. degree in mathematics in 1935 from the University of Vienna under the supervision of Philipp Furtwängler. Mann immigrated to the United States in 1938, and lived in New York, supporting himself by tutoring students.

In additive number theory, Mann proved the Schnirelmann–Landau conjecture on the asymptotic density of sumsets in 1942. By doing so he established Mann's theorem and earned the 1946 Cole Prize.

Statistics
In 1942 the Carnegie Foundation awarded Mann a fellowship to learn statistics while assisting the operations research group of Harold Hotelling at Columbia University. His group also supported Abraham Wald, and Wald and Mann collaborated on several papers. In statistics, Mann is known for the ("Mann–Whitney") U-statistic and its associated hypothesis test for nonparametric statistics. Collaborating with Wald, Mann developed the Mann–Wald theorem of asymptotic statistics and econometrics.

Mann wrote the first mathematical book on the design of experiments , whose principles allowed later statisticians to design and to analyze customized experiments. Like contemporary "self-help" and "how to"  books, the earlier books gave easy-to-follow examples but little theory beyond exhortations to follow three principles of Ronald A. Fisher—to "replicate", to "establish control" (for example with blocking), and to "randomize" (assignment of treatments to units).

According to Denis Conniffe: 
Ronald A. Fisher was "interested in application and in the popularization
of statistical methods and his early book Statistical Methods for Research Workers, published in 1925, went through many editions and
motivated and influenced the practical use of statistics in many fields of
study. His Design of Experiments (1935)  [promoted] statistical technique and application. In that book he
emphasized examples and how to design experiments systematically from
a statistical point of view. The mathematical justification of the methods
described was not stressed and, indeed, proofs were often barely sketched
or omitted altogether ..., a fact which led H. B. Mann to fill the gaps with a rigorous mathematical treatment in his well known treatise, ."

Later life
In 1946 Mann returned to Ohio State University, where he served as a professor mathematics until his retirement in 1964. Mann then became a professor at the U.S. Army's Mathematics Research Center at the University of Wisconsin–Madison 1964–1971. Mann was professor at the University of Arizona from 1971–1975. His doctoral students include George Marsaglia and William Yslas Vélez.

Publications

References

American statisticians
Number theorists
Additive combinatorialists
Group theorists
20th-century American mathematicians
University of Arizona faculty
Ohio State University faculty
University of Wisconsin–Madison faculty
People from Columbus, Ohio
Jewish emigrants from Austria to the United States after the Anschluss
1905 births
2000 deaths
Econometricians
20th-century American economists
Mathematical statisticians
University of Vienna alumni